John "Johnny" Fraser Dodd (16 March 1928 – 25 October 2007) was a New Zealand professional rugby league footballer who played in the 1950s.

Playing career
Dodd played for the St. George club in the Wellington Rugby League competition and represented Wellington. After a brilliant trial match in 1951 Dodd was selected for the New Zealand national rugby league team tour of Great Britain and France. Due to injuries Dodd didn't play a test on tour, however he did score four tries in nine tour games.

Dodd played for the North Island in 1952. He was part of St. George's premierships in 1953, 1955, 1957 and 1958.

References

1928 births
2007 deaths
New Zealand national rugby league team players
New Zealand rugby league players
Place of birth missing
Rugby league five-eighths
Wellington rugby league team players
St. George Saints players
North Island rugby league team players